Maki Kenjo (born 28 November 1970) is a former Japanese cricketer who played three Women's One Day International cricket matches for Japan national women's cricket team in 2003.

References

1970 births
Living people
Japanese women cricketers